Linda M. McGee (born September 20, 1949) is an American judge, who retired as the Chief Judge of the North Carolina Court of Appeals at the end of 2020. McGee retired as the "longest serving Court of Appeals judge in state history."

Born in Marion, North Carolina, McGee earned her undergraduate degree from the University of North Carolina at Chapel Hill in 1971 and her Juris Doctor (J.D.) degree from UNC-Chapel Hill two years later. After law school, she worked as executive director of the North Carolina Academy of Trial Lawyers from 1973 until 1978, when she entered private practice in Boone, North Carolina.

McGee was appointed to the Court of Appeals in 1995 by Governor Jim Hunt, and elected to eight-year terms in 1996 and 2004. In the 2012 election, McGee was re-elected for her final term, and was endorsed for re-election by the (Raleigh) News and Observer, which described her as an "energetic, experienced judge" and added, "Outside the courtroom, McGee is an effective advocate for the judicial system." She was appointed Chief Judge of the Court of Appeals by Supreme Court Chief Justice Sarah Parker, effective August 1, 2014.

She is married and has two children.

Notes

1949 births
Living people
North Carolina Court of Appeals judges
People from Marion, North Carolina
American women judges
North Carolina Democrats
21st-century American women